

Roman Defence Line
 Upper German Limes Limes Germanicus

Pre 1874 Defence Lines
 Circumvallatielinie van Groenlo 
Frisian Water Line (Friese Waterlinie)
 Groningse Waterlinie
 Helperlinie
 West Brabant waterline
 Linie van Beverwijk
 Linie van de Eems
 Linie van de Eendracht
 Linie van Noord-Holland
 Oostfrontier
Hollandic Water Line (Oude Hollandse Waterlinie)
 Positie van 's-Hertogenbosch
 Posten van Krayenhoff
 Staats - Spaanse Linies
 Stelling West Noord-Brabant
 Zijper Stelling
 Zuider Frontier

Fortification Law 1874
The Vestingwet (eng: Fortification Law) or Wet tot regeling en voltooiing van het vestingstelsel (eng: Law to regulate and complete the fortification) was signed on 18 April 1874. The law dealt with the defence of the Netherlands against enemy attacks.

The main principle was defence by flooding where as the army of the Netherlands would  withdraw to the area around Amsterdam. After the Franco-Prussian War (1870–1871) it became clear that a new defence plan was needed. The law was made by the Minister of War August Weitzel under King Willem III. The Law became dysfunctional at 28 March 1938.

Grebbe Line (Grebbelinie)
IJssel Line (IJssellinie)
New Hollandic Line (Nieuwe Hollandse Waterlinie)
Defence Line of Amsterdam (Stelling van Amsterdam)
 Stelling van Den Helder
 Stelling van het Hollandsch Diep en het Volkerak
 Stelling van de monden der Maas en van het Haringvliet
 Werken aan de Westerschelde
 Zuiderwaterlinie (Which includes the West Brabant waterline)

Interbellum (1918 - 1940)
 Bath & Zanddijk Stellingen
 Geullinie
Grebbe Line (Grebbelinie)
IJssel Line (IJssellinie)
 Kazematten Afsluitdijk
 Maaslinie
 Linge - Waallinie
 Oranjestelling
Peel-Raam Line (Peel-Raamstelling)
 Waal-Maaslinie
 Weerstandslinies Noord-Oost Nederland

World War II (1939 - 1945)
During the occupation of the Netherlands, the Germans made fortifications to stop the Allies from liberating the Netherlands and to protect their V2 rocket platforms in the Netherlands. The Germans built new defence lines like the Atlantic Wall but also reused the Dutch defence line like the Grebbe line. 

 Assenerstellung / Frieslandriegel
Atlantic Wall (Atlantikwall)
 Brabantstellung
 Vordere Wasserstellung
 Hintere Wasserstellung
Panther Line (Pantherstellung) 
 IJsselstellung

Cold War (1946 - 1991)
During the cold war a defence line was created to slow down the Russian attack on the Netherlands.

IJssel Line (IJssellinie) (1953–1964)

Maps of the Defence Lines

References

Fortifications in the Netherlands
Military history of the Netherlands
World War II defensive lines
World War II sites in the Netherlands
19th-century fortifications